Taza is a rural locality (an ulus) in Kurumkansky District, Republic of Buryatia, Russia. The population was 36 as of 2010.

Geography 
Taza is located 88 km northeast of Kurumkan (the district's administrative centre) by road. Nama is the nearest rural locality.

References 

Rural localities in Kurumkansky District